The men's bantamweight boxing competition at the 2012 Olympic Games in London was held from 28 July to 11 August at the ExCeL Exhibition Centre.

Twenty-eight boxers from 28 nations competed. Luke Campbell of Great Britain won the gold medal, defeating Ireland's John Joe Nevin in the final. Nevin took the silver medal and bronze medals were awarded to both semi-final losers.

Competition format
Like all Olympic boxing events, the competition was a straight single-elimination tournament. The competition consisted of 28 boxers who had qualified through various qualifying tournaments held in 2011 and 2012. The competition began with a preliminary round on 28 July, where the number of competitors was reduced to 16, and concluded with a final on 11 August. As there were less than 32 boxers in the competition a number of boxers received a bye for the preliminary round. Both semi-final losers were awarded bronze medals, so no boxers competed again after their first loss.

All bouts comprised three three-minute periods where the boxers received points for every successful punch they could land on their opponent's head or upper body. The boxer with the most points at the end of the bouts won. If a boxer was knocked to the ground and cannot get up before the referee counts to 10 then the bout is over and the opponent wins.

Schedule 
All times are British Summer Time (UTC+1)

Results

Finals

Top half

Bottom half

References

Boxing at the 2012 Summer Olympics
Men's events at the 2012 Summer Olympics